Bath Mountain is a summit in Yosemite National Park, United States.

Bath Mountain was so named when a USGS topographer took a bath in a lake at its base in 1905.

References

Mountains of Tuolumne County, California
Mountains of Northern California